Elisabeth Nauclér (born 7 March 1952 in Eda Municipality) is a Swedish-born Finnish independent politician and jurist. Naucler was the single member of parliament for the autonomous region of Åland in the Parliament of Finland. She sat with the mainland's Swedish People's Party in the parliament. In 2015 elections she was replaced by Mats Löfström. Nauclér's father was from Värmland in Sweden, and her mother was Norwegian.

Nauclér earned her degree in law in Uppsala University, and moved to Åland, Finland, with her Finnish husband. She began her career in the provincial administration of Åland in 1979 and continued until 2006. She was elected to the Parliament of Finland in the election of 2011 from the centre-right alliance Borgerlig allians (C, FS, Lib., Ob.).

See also 
 First women lawyers around the world

References 

1952 births
Living people
People from Eda Municipality
Swedish people of Norwegian descent
Forest Finns
Women from Åland in politics
Members of the Parliament of Finland (2007–11)
Members of the Parliament of Finland (2011–15)
Swedish emigrants to Finland
Norwegian emigrants to Finland
Swedish people of Forest Finnish descent
21st-century Finnish women politicians
Norwegian people of Forest Finnish descent
Women members of the Parliament of Finland